Dynasphere may refer to:

 Dynasphere (vehicle), a monowheel vehicle designed by John Archibald Purves
 Dynasphere (wind turbine), a vertical-axis wind turbine designed by Michael Reynolds

See also
 DYNAS